Lisa Kindred (1940 – November 11, 2019) was an American folk and blues singer.

Kindred, born in 1940 in Buffalo, New York, was a figure in the Greenwich Village and Cambridge, Massachusetts folk scenes of the 1960s. She played with Bob Dylan, Dave Van Ronk and other legendary folk singers, and was mentored by guitarist and songwriter Fred Neil. She performed at the Cafe Wha?, Club 47, The Bitter End and other venues. In that extraordinary musical era in the Village, she was influenced as well by visiting blues greats such as Mississippi John Hurt and Skip James and legendary jazz pianist/composers McCoy Tyner and Thelonious Monk.

Kindred's debut album, I Like It This Way, was released on Vanguard Records in 1965. Her second album was to have been released on Vanguard in 1966 under the title Kindred Spirit, but the master tapes were stolen and delivered to Mel Lyman, a musician in the backing band and soon-to-be leader of the Mel Lyman Family. The album was only released four years later on Warner Bros./Reprise Records under the aegis of the Lyman Family, titled American Avatar - Love Comes Rolling Down. The album cover showed a picture of Lyman, not Kindred. That was Kindred's last album on a major label. She became a long-time fixture on the San Francisco bar scene, appearing on occasional compilations and two self-released albums, Steppin' Up In Class (2003) and Blues and Beyond (2013).

In 1966, she organized and was the lead guitarist and singer with the UFOs, an avant-garde, all-female, rock band. It also featured Ann Sternberg, Diane Tribuno and Lorry Stanton. She and the other members were interviewed by Leonard Bernstein for the 1967 documentary, Inside Pop: The Rock Revolution, which also interviewed Graham Nash, Brian Wilson, Frank Zappa and from Herman's Hermits, singer Peter Noone. In the 1967 movie, The Love-Ins, the group performed their song, Hello World.

Kindred formed and led the Haight-Ashbury band Ascension, featuring lead guitarist Debbie Olcese and Kindred on rhythm guitar.  Kindred played and sang for many decades at the Saloon in North Beach in San Francisco and other venues. She sang on the 2009 album, Stu Blank and Friends, which included Charlie Musselwhite and Tommy Castro. In 2013, after co-producing it over four years with keyboardist Austin deLone, and joined by Dennis Geyer, Willie Riser and Dick McDonough, she released Blues and Beyond. San Francisco Chronicle music critic Joel Selvin, though not given to effusiveness, took the occasion to describe her as a "bona fide blues queen who sings like one of the greats."

In addition to her decades-long contributions to the folk and blues community in her home in Mill Valley, Marin County, California, and her many gigs at the Sweetwater Music Hall and other local venues, she has made civic contributions as well, directing the city's juvenile play program and worked for years as a teacher's aide at Park School.

Kindred died in San Rafael, California on November 11, 2019 at the age of 79 from POEMS syndrome.

Discography
1964: "New Folks Volume 2" (Vanguard)
1965: "I like it this way" (Vanguard)
1966: "The Lyman Family with Lisa Kindred: American Avatar Love Comes Rolling Down" (Vanguard)
2009: "BBQ Blues - Live from the Majic Lamp" (Jackalope Records)
2012: "Lisa Kindred Band: Steppin' Up in Class" (The Saloon Recordings)
2013: "Blues and Beyond" (Floating Records)

References

External links
Lisa Kindred official website
Lisa Kindred discography
Article containing review of American Avatar - Love Comes Rolling Down
Inside Pop: The Rock Revolution
Lisa Kindred sings with Blues Power at Nitro Tribute at Slims
Blues and Beyond - Keep on Rockin'
Get Out Of My Life Lisa Kindred & Friends at Art House gallery, Berkeley, California July 14, 2018

1940 births
2019 deaths
American women singers
American blues singers
American folk singers
Musicians from Buffalo, New York
Singers from New York (state)
People from Marin County, California
People from Mill Valley, California
21st-century American women